Alan Patterson (12 March 1886 – 14 March 1916) was a British track and field athlete who specialised in the 400 metres and 800 metres. He ran for the Sheffield United Harriers and the Salford Harriers, and competed in the 1908 and 1912 Summer Olympics.

Background
Patterson was born in Deal, Kent.

Army career
Patterson was a lieutenant and then captain in the British Army. Between the 1908 and 1912 Olympics he served in India.

Sports
Patterson ran for the Sheffield United Harriers, and later the Salford Harriers, and competed at the 1908 Summer Olympics in London and at the 1912 Summer Olympics in Stockholm. 

In the 400 metres event in 1908, Patterson took second place in his preliminary heat with a time of 50.6 seconds to winner John Atlee's 50.4 seconds.  Due to his loss, Patterson did not advance to the semifinals.

Four years later he was eliminated in the first round of the 400 metres competition as well as of the 800 metres event.

Death
Patterson was killed in action aged 30 during the First World War in Vermelles, Pas-de-Calais, serving as a captain with the Royal Artillery near Mazingarbe. He is buried at the Fosse 7 Military Cemetery nearby.

See also
 List of Olympians killed in World War I

References

External links

 
 
 
 Alan Patterson. Sports Reference. Retrieved on 2014-10-18.
  (Obituary of Patterson)
  (Obituary of Patterson)

1886 births
1916 deaths
People from Deal, Kent
Sportspeople from Kent
English male sprinters
English male middle-distance runners
Olympic male sprinters
Olympic athletes of Great Britain
Athletes (track and field) at the 1908 Summer Olympics
Athletes (track and field) at the 1912 Summer Olympics
Royal Field Artillery officers
British military personnel killed in World War I
British Army personnel of World War I